Paula Freiin von Wächter-Spittler (7 December 1860, near Ummendorf - 15 October 1944, Ummendorf) was a German painter.

Life and work 
She was descended from a noble family, which included , a Privy Councilor for the Kingdom of Württemberg. From 1878 to 1889, she studied at the Royal Art School in Stuttgart, with the genre painter, Friedrich von Keller. During the school year of 1884-1885, she spent a few months in Paris, taking classes at the Académie Julian.

For mush of her life, she worked as a free-lance artist, specializing in portraits, still-lifes, and animal paintings; with an emphasis on composition. From 1911 to 1912, she assisted Adolf Hölzel in the ladies' painting classes at the art school, which by then had become a State Academy.

As a representative of the association, she helped organize a gathering of all the similar organizations in Germany, in Munich (1907), to pursue the goal of men and women being exhibited together, and women being allowed to serve as judges.

She was also a member of several other related groups; such as the Frauenkunstverband Stuttgart (1915 to 1927) the Württembergischer Kunstverein Stuttgart, and the Freien Vereinigung württembergischer Künstler. In addition, she assisted with the pension fund administered by the Pensionsanstalt für Deutsche Bildende Künstler Weimar.

References

Further reading 
 Julius Baum, Max Diez, Eugen Gradmann, Gustav Keysser, Gustav Pazaurek, Heinrich Weizsäcker, Die Stuttgarter Kunst der Gegenwart, Deutsche Verlags-Anstalt, 1913, pp.101-102, 302
 Willy Oskar Dreßler, Das Buch der lebenden deutschen Künstler, Altertumsforscher, Kunstgelehrten und Kunstschriftsteller, #8, Vol.2, Bildende Kunst, 1921
 "Paula von Waechter". In: Hans Vollmer (Ed.): Allgemeines Lexikon der Bildenden Künstler von der Antike bis zur Gegenwart, Vol.35: Waage–Wilhelmson. E. A. Seemann, Leipzig 1942, pg.16
 Gert K. Nagel, Schwäbisches Künstlerlexikon. Vom Barock bis zur Gegenwart, Kunst und Antiquitäten, 1986, 
 Edith Neumann, Künstlerinnen in Württemberg. Zur Geschichte des Württembergischen Malerinnen-Vereins und des Bundes Bildender Künstlerinnen Württembergs, 2 Vols., Klett-Cotta, 1999,

External links 

 
 More works by Waechter @ ArtNet

1860 births
1944 deaths
German painters
German portrait painters
German still life painters
German women painters
People from Biberach (district)